Harald Eriksen is a Norwegian sprint canoeist who competed in the mid-1950s. He won a bronze medal in the K-1 10000 m event at the 1954 ICF Canoe Sprint World Championships in Mâcon.

References

Living people
Norwegian male canoeists
Year of birth missing (living people)
ICF Canoe Sprint World Championships medalists in kayak
20th-century Norwegian people